Andy Gorski is an English professional rugby league footballer. He has previously played for Salford City Reds in the Super League, along with spells with Halifax, the Rochdale Hornets and the Leigh Centurions. Gorski is currently on loan with the North Wales Crusaders.

References

External links
(archived by web.archive.org) Whitehaven profile
Rugby League Project stats

1981 births
Living people
British people of Polish descent
English rugby league players
Halifax R.L.F.C. players
Leigh Leopards players
North Wales Crusaders players
Rochdale Hornets players
Rugby league locks
Salford Red Devils players
Swinton Lions players
Whitehaven R.L.F.C. players